Parina was an unincorporated community located in Bracken County, Kentucky, United States. Their Post Office has ceased to exist.

References

Unincorporated communities in Bracken County, Kentucky
Unincorporated communities in Kentucky